Ziaul Haque (died 1998) was a Pakistani scholar of economic history and Islamic studies, who worked in the Islamic Research Institute in Islamabad from September 1964 to June 1984 as Researcher/Associate Professor. Later he would join the Pakistan Institute of Development Economics, Islamabad, as a consultant and rose up to the position of Chief of Research there.

Education and career
Haque was educated at the University of Sindh and the University of Chicago, focusing on subjects like Economics, Arabic and Islamic studies. He specialized in the economic history of early Islam and the Middle East, and also wrote extensively about the current economic issues in Islamic countries. He served as Editor of the quarterly research journal Islamic Studies, and also as Associate Editor of The Pakistan Development Review and South Asia Bulletin.

Among Haque's publications were the books Prophets and Progress in Islam (Kuala Lumpur: Utusan, 2008); Landlord and Peasant in Early Islam (Islamabad, 1977); Islam and Feudalism: The Economics of RIBA, Interest and Profit  (1985), later expanded as RIBA: The Moral Economy of Usury, Interest and Profit (Kuala Lumpur: Ikraq, 1995); and Revelation and Revolution in Islam (1987).

Notes 

Year of birth missing
1998 deaths
Economic historians
Historians of Islam
Pakistani economists
University of Chicago alumni
University of Sindh alumni